Plota is a rural locality (a khutor) in Rusanovsky Selsoviet Rural Settlement, Fatezhsky District, Kursk Oblast, Russia. The population as of 2010 is 17.

Geography 
The khutor is located on the Plota Brook (a right tributary of the Reut in the basin of the Svapa), 99.5 km from the Russia–Ukraine border, 55 km north-west of Kursk, 10 km north-west of the district center – the town Fatezh, 9.5 km from the selsoviet center – Basovka.

Climate
Plota has a warm-summer humid continental climate (Dfb in the Köppen climate classification).

Transport 
Plota is located 5.5 km from the federal route  Crimea Highway as part of the European route E105, 5 km from the road of regional importance  (Fatezh – Dmitriyev), 1 km from the road of intermunicipal significance  (38K-038 – Nizhny Reut – Putchino), 24 km from the nearest railway halt 34 km (railway line Arbuzovo – Luzhki-Orlovskiye).

The rural locality is situated 57 km from Kursk Vostochny Airport, 177 km from Belgorod International Airport and 241 km from Voronezh Peter the Great Airport.

References

Notes

Sources

Rural localities in Fatezhsky District